Helen Johnson, stage name, Pacita del Río, was a Filipina actress known for playing countless roles as the Villain.  She is one of the leading actresses before World War II.

Del Río always played a mistress or lover in the movies made by Carmen Rosales.

Personal life
Helen Johnson was born in Manila, Philippine Islands (now Philippines) on September 23, 1921.  She had one boy, Bernard Johnson.  She died in San Diego on November 13, 1989 at the age of 69.

Filmography
1938 -Ako'y Maghihintay  [Excelsior]
1939 -Arimunding-Arimunding  [Excelsior]
1939 -Pag-ibig ng Isang Ina  [Phils. Artist Guild]
1939 -Matamis na Kasinungalingan  ?
1940 -Lihim ng kapatid  [Excelsior]
1940 -Ave Maria  [Excelsior]
1940 -Ikaw Rin  [Excelsior]
1940 -Patawad  (Lvn Pictures)
1940 -Maginoong Takas  [Lvn]
1940 -Dating Sumpaan  [Excelsior]
1940 -Alitaptap  [Waling-Waling]
1941 -Ibong Sawi  [Excelsior]
1941 -Carmen (Sampaguita Pictures)
1941 -Princesita  [Sampaguita]
1941 -Mariposa  [Sampaguita]
1941 -Panibugho  [Sampaguita]
1941 -Sa Iyong Kandungan  [Sampaguita]
1941 -Tampuhan  [Sampaguita]
1941 -Palikero  [Sampaguita]
1946 -Ligaya  [Oriental]
1947 -Si,  Si...Senorito  [Sampaguita]
1947 -Bisig ng Batas  [McLaurin Bros.]
1947 -Oh,  Salapi!  [Lvn]
1947 -Anak-Pawis  lPalaris]
1948 -Waling-Waling  [Lvn]
1948 -Batang Lansangan  [Milagrosa]
1951 -Tres Muskiteros  [Sampaguita]

External links

References

1921 births
1989 deaths
Actresses from Manila
Filipino emigrants to the United States